Iraq participated in the 2009 Asian Indoor Games in Hanoi, Vietnam on 30 October – 8 November 2009.

Medal winners

References

Iraq at multi-sport events
Nations at the 2009 Asian Indoor Games
2009 in Iraqi sport
Iraq at the Asian Games